The Cardinal Conference was a high school athletic conference in north central Ohio that existed from 1960 to 1987.  With its dissolution, several teams joined the Ohio Heartland Conference.  In 2003, a new conference, the Ohio Cardinal Conference, was formed with the expressed intention of preserving the legacy of the original Cardinal Conference.

History
Attempts to form the Cardinal Conference began as early as 1949; by 1955, discussions began in earnest and on April 8, 1959, the new conference was officially formed.  The conference remained stable throughout the 1960s and 1970s.  In 1981, Mansfield Malabar became the first school to leave the conference; in 1983, Coshocton High School followed suit. The remaining conference members discussed adding several schools, including readmitting Malabar, adding Mansfield Senior High School or Mt. Vernon High School, but travel considerations prevented any agreement from being reached.

By the mid-1980s, the conference began to disintegrate.  Madison and Ashland left the conference for the newly formed Ohio Heartland Conference. Dover High School joined the Senate League.  Wooster and New Philadelphia both joined the Federal League. The Cardinal Conference officially disbanded following the 1986-87 school year.

Over the conference's history, the conference had four separate commissioners.  The first commissioner, Don Welsh, was associated with Wooster.  Welsh was succeeded by O.J. Thompson, and he by Joe Romano.  New Philadelphia's Jim Roman was the final conference commissioner in the 1980s.

Members

The following schools were members of the Cardinal Conference during its duration.
Ashland High School (1960-1987)
Coshocton High School (1961-1983)
Dover High School (1960-1987)
Madison High School (1960-1987)
Malabar High School (1961-1981)
New Philadelphia High School (1961-1987)
Wooster High School (1960-1987)

Conference rivalries
Wooster vs. Madison
Dover vs. New Philadelphia

State championships

Fall sports
This only includes state championships won while schools were members of the Cardinal Conference:

Notable athletes
James R. Black, Dover (1980)

References

External links
A History of the Lincoln Highway Leagues

See also
 Ohio High School Athletic Conferences

Ohio high school sports conferences